Ion Ieremciuc (born 23 June 1967) is a Romanian wrestler. He competed in the men's Greco-Roman 100 kg at the 1992 Summer Olympics.

References

External links
 

1967 births
Living people
Romanian male sport wrestlers
Olympic wrestlers of Romania
Wrestlers at the 1992 Summer Olympics
Sportspeople from Suceava